Quadrelle is a village and comune of the province of Avellino in the Campania region of southern Italy.

Festivals
Every year, in August, there is a religious festival dedicated to John the Baptist. On the 17 January there is a traditional celebration called the Maio of Saint Anthony the Abbot.

Notes and references

Cities and towns in Campania